Max Taylor (born October 25, 1985) is a British singer-songwriter from East London. He has accompanied singer Mika on albums and international tours since 2012, playing bass and contributing vocals.

Debuts 
Taylor was first part of the band Clor, alongside his brother, Harry Bennett, who played drums.

He also toured with British rapper Roots Manuva during this period, and Max had the opportunity to collaborate with many different artists and bands, such as Groove Armada, Tom Vek, Rae Morris, Melanie C, and also CocknBullKid.

He has also played bass for the famous British pop singer Lily Allen and also for Fryars. In 2012, Taylor met Mika, and recorded bass for him on a few songs from his album "The Origin Of Love", which included a collaboration with Pharrell Williams on the song "Celebrate". That was the start of their collaboration which hasn't ended.

Touring 
Taylor joined Mika's band for the album's promotional tour. He played bass and accompanied Mika on vocals, and since 2014 he became an official member of the band, and accompanies Mika through his concert tours taking place all over the world, in places such as the Temple of Jupiter in Baalbek, Lebanon, or even the Montreal Symphony House, in Quebec or even the Royal Opera of Versailles, and the Philharmonie de Paris, both broadcast on  France Télévisions, alongside the famous opera singer Ida Falk Winland, assisted by the Orchestre National d'Ile de France.

The most recent tour with Mika took place in 2022 and covered Canada, and the USA, under the name "For The Rite Of Spring"Tour. Taylor continues to perform alongside Mika, and dates keep being announced across Europe, including the Italian tour "The Magic Piano Tour".

Solo Career 
In October 2020, Taylor embarked on a solo career, alongside his other activities, and started working with IAMPC Music . He released the famous single "Millionaire Spaceman", under the pseudonym of Creepy Neighbour,  an then an EP signed to the label the state51 Conspiracy, for which he collaborated with the famous video producer Andreas Dermanis and director Zan Tot on several music videos shot in Athens, Greece. The EP is made up of the following titles:

- Millionaire Spaceman

- Happy Birthday

- Some Girls

- J'ai Mal a la Tête

- We Can Be Friends

- No One Really Loves You

The artist released his debut album in December 2021, ironically titled "Debut Album", recorded at Bluebarn Studios, in Ely (England), which was announced by the single "Somebody Else's Dream". 

Taylor announced on his social media and his official website he is going to release new music in 2023, under his own birth name. He explained this would be a new concept which involves releasing one song agfter the other, once a month, in order to tell a story, like a musical series to follow.

References 

1985 births
Living people
British male singer-songwriters